Start was a Polish twin-lens reflex camera of Rolleicord type produced by Warsaw Photo-Optical Works, or WZFO. It was the first camera produced in Poland after World War II. The Start range was produced in numerous versions – Start, Start II, Start B, Start 66 and Start 66S.

Start 66S was exported outside of the Poland under names "NOCO flex" and "Universa Uniflex 66".

Camera editions 
 Start (1951–1952, 1954–1960)
 Start II (1960–1965)
 Start B (1960–1967)
 Start 66 (1967–1970)
 Start 66S (ca. 1970–1982)

Notes

References

See also 
 

120 film cameras
Polish cameras
TLR cameras